The Norm Smith Medal is an Australian rules football award presented annually to the player adjudged the best on ground in the Grand Final of the Australian Football League (AFL). Prior to 1990 the competition was known as the Victorian Football League (VFL). It was first presented in the 1979 VFL Grand Final, and was won by Wayne Harmes, playing in Carlton's premiership victory against Collingwood. The award is named in honour of Norm Smith who won four VFL premierships as a player and six as coach for the Melbourne Football Club.

Dustin Martin (2017, 2019 and 2020) is the only player to win the award three times. The award is usually won by a player on the winning team in the Grand Final; only four players have received the award as members of the losing teams: Maurice Rioli in 1982, Gary Ablett Sr. in 1989, Nathan Buckley in 2002 and Chris Judd in 2005.   The club with the most Norm Smith Medal wins is Hawthorn, with eight awards won by players representing the club. The most recent recipient of the award is Geelong's Isaac Smith, who became the oldest player to receive the award, winning in 2022.

Voting and presentation 
The winner is voted on by a five-member panel consisting of former players, journalists and media personalities, with one member designated as the chair. Each panellist independently awards 3 votes, 2 votes and 1 vote to the players they regard as the best, second best and third best in the match respectively. These votes are tallied, and the highest number of combined votes wins the medal.

There is no chance of a tie for the medal; if two players are tied for votes, the following countbacks will apply in order:
the player with the higher number of three-votes;
the player with the higher number of two-votes;
the player deemed best by the panel chair.

Paul Chapman is the only player to win on a countback, after he and Jason Gram tied with nine votes apiece in 2009.

In some years judges were required to lodge their decisions prior to the completion of the match, to ensure votes were compiled in time for the ceremony. This was changed following the 2002 AFL Grand Final, after Michael Voss had five crucial possessions in the last five minutes of the close game which could have swayed the voting, but eventually placed fourth behind Nathan Buckley. After the match, three of the five judges suggested they would have voted differently if they had lodged their votes after the final siren.

Prior to the 2016 season, if the Grand Final resulted in a draw, the game would be replayed the following week. In such instances, a separate Norm Smith Medal was awarded in each game. Since 2016, a drawn Grand Final would result in the use of extra time to determine the winner, rather than a full match replay.

The medal is presented in a post-match ceremony held immediately after the conclusion of the match. Since 2004, former Norm Smith medallists have presented the award, in the order of the year in which they won; as of 2019, Gary Ablett Sr. is the only former winner to decline presenting the award; and Nathan Buckley's position in the sequence was skipped in 2019 as he was coaching Collingwood, who were yet to be eliminated when the decision on presenter had to be made.

Recipients

Players with multiple wins

Club totals

See also
 Clive Churchill Medal
 Karyn Murphy Medal
 Harry Sunderland Trophy

References

Bibliography

External links 
 Norm Smith Medal - AFL.com.au

Australian Football League awards
Australian rules football awards
Awards established in 1979
1979 establishments in Australia
Australian rules football-related lists